Quercus oocarpa is a Mesoamerican species of oak.

It is native to Central America and southern Mexico, with an isolated population in the canyons of Jalisco in western Mexico.

Description 

Range and habitat
Quercus oocarpa ranges from southwestern Mexico (Nayarit, Jalisco, and Guerrero states, and possibly Chiapas), through Guatemala, Honduras, Nicaragua, and Costa Rica to Panama. Some specimens of Quercus insignis M.Martens & Galeotti from Chiapas have been confused with this species.

It inhabits humid montane forests, including cloud forests and pine–oak–Liquidambar forests, between 1400 and 2000 meters elevation.

References

oocarpa
Trees of Central America
Trees of Southwestern Mexico
Plants described in 1854
Oaks of Mexico
Flora of the Sierra Madre del Sur
Sierra Madre de Chiapas
Flora of the Central American montane forests
Chiapas montane forests
Flora of the Talamancan montane forests